Peter Brown (born 9 August 1952) is a former Australian rules footballer who played for South Melbourne in the Victorian Football League (VFL) between 1971 and 1976.

References

External links

1952 births
Living people
Sydney Swans players
Australian rules footballers from Victoria (Australia)